Taftanaz Subdistrict  is a Syrian nahiyah (subdistrict) located in Idlib District in Idlib.  According to the Syria Central Bureau of Statistics (CBS), Taftanaz Subdistrict had a population of 24,145 in the 2004 census.

References 

Subdistricts of Idlib Governorate